Harinela Randriamanarivo (born 25 January 1966) is a Malagasy weightlifter. He competed in the men's featherweight event at the 1992 Summer Olympics.

References

1966 births
Living people
Malagasy male weightlifters
Olympic weightlifters of Madagascar
Weightlifters at the 1992 Summer Olympics
Place of birth missing (living people)